Thomas Memorial AME Zion Church is a historic African Methodist Episcopal Zion church located at Watertown in Jefferson County, New York. It was built in 1909 and is a small front gabled vernacular building with minimal Gothic details.  It is constructed of cast concrete blocks and features a plain square tower with no spire.
Its also a place where the run away slaves would use as a hub for the under ground railroad, along with several houses on the street. It was listed on the National Register of Historic Places in 2002.

References

Churches on the National Register of Historic Places in New York (state)
African Methodist Episcopal churches in New York (state)
Gothic Revival church buildings in New York (state)
Churches completed in 1909
20th-century Methodist church buildings in the United States
National Register of Historic Places in Watertown, New York
Churches in Watertown, New York